Acomis is a genus of flowering plants in the family Asteraceae described as a genus in 1867. The entire genus is endemic to Australia. It was first described and published in Fragm. Vol.2 on page 89 in 1860.

 Accepted species
 Acomis acoma (F.Muell.) Druce - Victoria
 Acomis bella A.E.Holland - Queensland
 Acomis kakadu Paul G.Wilson - Northern Territory
 Acomis macra F.Muell. - Queensland

References

Gnaphalieae
Asteraceae genera
Endemic flora of Australia
Plants described in 1860